Shavers may refer to:

Surname
Charlie Shavers (1920–1971), American swing era jazz trumpet player
China Shavers (born 1977), American actress
Dinerral Shavers (born 1981), jazz drummer and educator from New Orleans, Louisiana
Earnie Shavers (1944–2022), American former professional boxer

Places
United States
Shavers Fork, situated in the Allegheny Mountains of eastern West Virginia, USA
Shavers Fork Mountain Complex, the mountains on either side of Shavers Fork
Shavers Mountain, high and rugged ridge in the Allegheny Mountains of eastern West Virginia

See also
Shaver (disambiguation)
Shivers (disambiguation)
Savers